In mathematics, poly-Bernoulli numbers, denoted as , were defined by M. Kaneko as

where Li is the polylogarithm. The  are the usual Bernoulli numbers.

Moreover, the Generalization of Poly-Bernoulli numbers with a,b,c parameters defined as follows

where Li is the polylogarithm. 

Kaneko also gave two combinatorial formulas:

where  is the number of ways to partition a size  set into  non-empty subsets (the Stirling number of the second kind).

Also it is the number of open tours by a biased rook on a board  (see A329718 for definition).

The Poly-Bernoulli number  satisfies the following asymptotic:

For a positive integer n and a prime number p, the poly-Bernoulli numbers satisfy

which can be seen as an analog of Fermat's little theorem. Further, the equation

has no solution for integers x, y, z, n > 2; an analog of Fermat's Last Theorem.
Moreover, there is an analogue of Poly-Bernoulli numbers (like Bernoulli numbers and Euler numbers) which is known as Poly-Euler numbers.

See also
 Bernoulli numbers
 Stirling numbers
 Gregory coefficients
 Bernoulli polynomials
 Bernoulli polynomials of the second kind
 Stirling polynomials

References

.

.
.
.

Integer sequences
Enumerative combinatorics